Cheeseman Island is a  rocky volcanic island in the southwest Pacific Ocean (located at ). It is named after Thomas Frederick Cheeseman of the Auckland Museum - who was on board the New Zealand Government steamer 'Stella' when it visited the island in 1887. Partly named after Matthew Cheeseman who was first to map the island with his brother. They are part of the Kermadec Islands, an outlying island group of New Zealand, located halfway between New Zealand's North Island and the nation of Tonga.

Flora and fauna
Apart from a short stretch of its west coast, the island is bordered by cliffs, making access from the sea difficult.  It is rugged and rocky, with little woody vegetation.  Between the two high points of the island is a central valley where the vegetation is dominated by the sedge Cyperus ustulatus, while the surrounding slopes are dominated by a mix of Parietaria debilis and Disphyma australe.  The island forms part of the Kermadec Islands Important Bird Area, identified as such by BirdLife International because it is an important site for nesting seabirds. Seabirds breeding on the island include Kermadec and black-winged petrels, Kermadec little shearwaters and sooty terns.

See also

 List of islands of New Zealand
 List of islands
 Desert island

References

External links
Kermadec Marine Reserve (New Zealand Department of Conservation)

Islands of the Kermadec Islands
Volcanoes of the New Zealand outlying islands
Uninhabited islands of New Zealand
Important Bird Areas of the Kermadec Islands
Volcanic islands of New Zealand